Conversation with a Cupboard Man (also known as The Conversation with the Man from the Closet) is a 1993 Polish drama film  written and directed by Mariusz Grzegorzek and loosely based on a short story by Ian McEwan. 

The film was entered into the main competition at the 50th edition of the Venice Film Festival. It also won the Special Jury Prize at the 1993 Polish Film Festival.

Plot
Charles sits for hours in a wardrobe in a rented room on the attic, looking back on his whole life. He was brought up by a single mother who loved his only child with a sick desperate feeling and limited all his world to her own person. Charles' tragedy began with his adolescence. It made his mother aware of her feminity that resulted in her new marriage. Together with a new husband she decided to send the boy to a school for retarded children. Upon leaving the school Charles starts to seek his longing mother who moved out, in a meanwhile, not giving any address...

Cast 
  
  Bożena Adamek as Mother 
  Rafał Olbrychski as  Karol
 Karol Cieślar as   Karol (3 years old)
  Maciej Wilk as   Karol (7 years old)
 Adam Ferency as Kitchen Master 
 Marek Walczewski as  Teacher 
 Stanisława Celińska as Postwoman 
 Leon Niemczyk as  Inspector 
  Ewa Frąckiewicz as  Mrs. Weiss 
  Marek Siudym as  Mother's Fiancé
  Piotr Pawłowski as Deth 
 Wiesława Mazurkiewicz  as Old Gravedigger 
 Katarzyna Bargiełowska as Young Cook

References

External links

   
1993 drama films
Films directed by Ildikó Enyedi
Polish drama films
1993 directorial debut films
1993 films